Bisheh Zard may refer to:
 Bisheh Zard, Fasa
 Bisheh Zard, Qir and Karzin